Martin Sloane is Canadian author Michael Redhill's first novel, published in 2001 by Doubleday Canada. The novel explores the disappearance of Martin Sloane, a reclusive collage artist from Toronto, through the eyes of Jolene, a young woman from Bloomington, Indiana with whom he had a longstanding casual romantic relationship.

The novel was a shortlisted nominee for the 2001 Giller Prize, and won the Books in Canada First Novel Award in 2002.

References

2001 Canadian novels
Novels about artists
Novels by Michael Redhill
2001 debut novels